A tribunal of inquiry is an official review of events or actions ordered by a government body. In many common law countries, such as the United Kingdom, Ireland, Australia and Canada, such a public inquiry differs from a royal commission in that a public inquiry accepts evidence and conducts its hearings in a more public forum and focuses on a more specific occurrence. Interested members of the public and organisations may make (written) evidential submissions, as is the case with most inquiries, and also listen to oral evidence given by other parties.

Typical events for a public inquiry are those that cause multiple deaths, such as public transport crashes or mass murders. In addition, in the UK, the Planning Inspectorate, an agency of the Department for Communities and Local Government, routinely holds public inquiries into a range of major and lesser land use developments, including highways and other transport proposals.

Advocacy groups and opposition political parties are likely to ask for public inquiries for all manner of issues. The government of the day typically only accedes to a fraction of these requests. The political decision whether to appoint a public inquiry into an event was found to be dependent on several factors. The first is the extent of media coverage of the event; those that receive more media interest are more likely to be inquired. Second, since the appointment of a public inquiry is typically made by government ministers, events that involve allegations of blame on the part of the relevant minister are less likely to be investigated by a public inquiry. Third, a public inquiry generally takes longer to report and costs more on account of its public nature. Thus, when a government refuses a public inquiry on some topic, it is usually on at least one of these grounds.

The conclusions of the inquiry are delivered in the form of a written report, given first to the government, and soon after published to the public. The report will generally make recommendations to improve the quality of government or management of public organisations in the future. Recent studies have shown that the reports of public inquiries are not effective in changing public opinion regarding the event in question. Despite claims that appointing a public inquiry leads to a decline in media attention to the inquired issue, empirical studies do not find support for this claim.
 Public inquiry reports appear to enjoy public trust only when they are critical of the government, and tend to lose credibility when they find no fault on the part of the government.

France
In France, any major project which requires the compulsory acquisition of private property must, before being approved, be the subject of a public inquiry (usually by the prefect of the region or department in which the project will take place); the favourable outcome of such an inquiry is a déclaration d'utilité publique, a formal finding that the project will produce public benefit. This procedure was established by the law on expropriation enacted on 7 July 1833, which extended an earlier law enacted in 1810.

Republic of Ireland

South Africa 

A number of historically important public inquiries have taken place in South Africa since the advent of full democracy in 1994.  A number of which have looked into national scale events such as systematic human rights abuses during apartheid or wide scale corruption.

United Kingdom

Hong Kong
In Hong Kong, the Commissions of Inquiry Ordinance was enacted for establishing such a commission. The commission established after the 2012 Lamma Island ferry collision produced a report of its findings which they made public; an internal report was kept confidential. In the 2019–20 Hong Kong protests, one of the five key demands of the protesters, was establishing another commission for the protests itself.

See also
Inquest, a similar investigation with lesser scope
Royal Commission
Tribunal
Inquiries Act 2005 (UK statute which provides for the holding of inquiries)

References

External links
National Archives full list of those UK public inquiries with websites 

 
Government